Allomegalocotyla is a genus of monopisthocotylean monogeneans, included in the family Capsalidae.
All species in this genus are parasitic.

Species
These species are currently recognized in the genus:

 Allomegalocotyla gabbari Buhrnheim, Gomes & Varela, 1973
 Allomegalocotyla johnstoni (Robinson, 1961) Yamaguti, 1963

References

External links

Monopisthocotylea
Monogenea genera